Gloria Ofoegbu (born 3 January 1992) is a Nigerian footballer who plays as a left back and wing back for Rivers Angels and the Nigeria women's national football team. She represented Nigeria twice at FIFA U-20 tournaments in 2010 where she won silver after Nigeria finished second and in 2012. She also represented Nigeria at the 2014 African Women's Championship in Namibia.

References

External links
 

Living people
1992 births
Nigerian women's footballers
Women's association football defenders
Nigeria women's international footballers
Rivers Angels F.C. players
People from Calabar